Kolmogorov microscales are the smallest scales in turbulent flow. At the Kolmogorov scale, viscosity dominates and the turbulent kinetic energy is dissipated into heat. They are defined by

Typical values of the Kolmogorov length scale, for atmospheric motion in which the large eddies have length scales on the order of kilometers, range from 0.1 to 10 millimeters; for smaller flows such as in laboratory systems,  may be much smaller.

The definitions of the Kolmogorov microscales can be obtained using this idea and dimensional analysis.

Alternatively, the definition of the Kolmogorov time scale can be obtained from the inverse of the mean square strain rate tensor,  which also gives  using the definition of the energy dissipation rate per unit mass .  Then the Kolmogorov length scale can be obtained as the scale at which the Reynolds number is equal to 1, .  

The Kolmogorov 1941 theory is a mean field theory since it assumes that the relevant dynamical parameter is the mean energy dissipation rate.  In fluid turbulence, the energy dissipation rate fluctuates in space and time, so it is possible to think of the microscales as quantities that also vary in space and time.  However, standard practice is to use mean field values since they represent the typical values of the smallest scales in a given flow.

See also
Taylor microscale
Integral length scale
Batchelor scale

References 

Turbulence